Shimoyama may refer to:

Shimoyama (surname)
Shimoyama, Aichi, a former village in Aichi Prefecture, Japan
Shimoyama Station (disambiguation), multiple railway stations in Japan
2908 Shimoyama, a main-belt asteroid